Dodie Bellamy (born 1951) is an American novelist, nonfiction author, journalist, educator and editor. Her book, Cunt-Ups (2001) won the 2002 Firecracker Alternative Book Award. Her work is frequently associated with that of the New Narrative movement in San Francisco and fellow writers Dennis Cooper, Kathy Acker, Kevin Killian, and Eileen Myles.

Early life and education 
Bellamy was born Doris Jane Bellamy in 1951 in North Hammond, Indiana. She grew up in Indiana and went on to study at Indiana University. She graduated in 1973.

San Francisco and New Narrative 
Bellamy moved to San Francisco in 1978. She was a core member of The Feminist Writers’ Guild.

Bellamy is one of the originators in the New Narrative literary movement of the early and mid 1980s. The movement attempts to use the tools of experimental fiction, like transgression, porn, gossip, and memoir, as well as French critical theory and incorporates them to narrative storytelling. Bellamy was a co-editor along with, Kevin Killian, of the New Narrative anthology Writers Who Love Too Much: New Narrative, 1977–1997.

Works 
Bellamy published her first novel, The Letters of Mina Harker, in 1998 and follows minor character from Bram Stoker's Dracula and fictionalizes her as a woman living in 1980s San Francisco. The book was re-published in 2021 by Semiotext(e). She published a memoir made up of blog entries, called The Buddhist, in 2011 which follows a similar format as Dennis Cooper's The Sluts. Bellamy's book features a self-destructive affair with a third-rate self-help guru. The TV Sutras, was a 2014 memoir that draws heavily from her own experience in the cult Eckankar.

Bellamy's memoir and essay collections include Pink Steam (2004), Academonia (2006), and When the Sick Rule the World (2015).

The writer's poetry collections include Cunt-Ups (2001), a feminist reworking of the cut-up technique practiced by William S. Burroughs and Brion Gysin, which received the Firecracker Award for Innovative Poetry, and Cunt Norton (2013).

Barf Manifesto (2008), was influence by the writer's intimate and working relationship with Eileen Myles.

A collection of new essays, Bellamy Is on Our Mind, was published in 2020 by Wattis ICA/Semiotext(e).

Bellamy has stated that she draws inspiration from Conceptual art and writing practices, including cut-ups and generated texts.

Bellamy has also directed the San Francisco literary non-profit and writing lab, Small Press Traffic. She has taught creative writing at the San Francisco Art Institute, Mills College, University of California, Santa Cruz, University of San Francisco, Naropa University, Antioch University Los Angeles, San Francisco State University, California College of the Arts, and the California Institute of the Arts.

Published works

Story, novels, and poetry collections 

 Real: The Letters of Mina Harker and Sam d'Allesandro
 Fat Chance
 Cunt-Ups
 The Letters of Mina Harker 
 Pink Steam 
 Academonia
 Barf Manifesto
 Cunt Norton 
 The Beating of Our Hearts
 The TV Sutras 
 When the Sick Rule the World 
 The Buddhist
 Bee Reaved

Artist monographs 

 B. Wurtz: Farm 5

Contributing writer or editor in essay collections 

 a queer anthology of healing
 Writers Who Love Too Much: New Narrative Writing 1977–1997
 Dodie Bellamy Is on Our Mind
 Small Blows Against Encroaching Totalitarianism Volume 1
 As Yet Untitled: Artists and Writers in Collaboration
 Conversations at the Wartime Cafe: a Decade of War 2001–2011
 Say Bye to Reason and Hi to Everything
 Feminine Hijinx
 High Risk: An Anthology of Forbidden Writings
 The Big Book of Erotic Ghost Stories
 The New Fuck You: Adventures In Lesbian Reading
 Pills, Thrills, Chills, and Heartache: Adventures in the First Person

Bibliography 
Feminine Hijinx (1991) 
Real: The Letters of Mina Harker and Sam D'Allesandro (1994) .
Broken English (1996) 

Cunt-ups (2001) 
The Letters of Mina Harker (2004) 
Academonia (2006) 

Barf Manifesto (2008) 
Pink Steam (2008) 
Cunt Norton (2013) 
The TV Sutras (2014)  
The Beating of Our Hearts (2014)  
 When the Sick Rule the World (2015) 
Writers Who Love Too Much: New Narrative Writing 1977–1997 (co-edited with Kevin Killian; Nightboat Books, 2017)

References

External links
 
 Academonia at Krupskaya Books
 Lodestar Quarterly interview
 Jacket interview
Kevin Killian and Dodie Bellamy Papers. Yale Collection of American Literature, Beinecke Rare Book and Manuscript Library.

Living people
20th-century American novelists
20th-century American women writers
21st-century American novelists
21st-century American women writers
American editors
American women journalists
American women novelists
Bisexual women
California College of the Arts faculty
American LGBT novelists
American LGBT journalists
LGBT people from Indiana
People from Hammond, Indiana
San Francisco State University faculty
Writers from San Francisco
20th-century American non-fiction writers
21st-century American non-fiction writers
Bisexual academics
American women academics
1951 births
21st-century American LGBT people
Bisexual journalists
American bisexual writers